Rehmerloh-Mennighüffer Mühlenbach (also: Mühlenbach, in its upper course: Teudenbach) is a river of North Rhine-Westphalia, Germany. It is a left tributary of the Werre. Its source is near the village Oberbauerschaft. It flows generally southeast through the villages Quernheim, Rehmerloh and Ulenburg, and joins the Werre east of Löhne.

See also
List of rivers of North Rhine-Westphalia

References

Rivers of North Rhine-Westphalia
Rivers of Germany